The 2021 KNSB Dutch Single Distance Championships were held at the Thialf skating rink in Heerenveen from Friday 30 October 2020 to Sunday 1 November 2020. Although the tournament was held in 2020 it was the 2021 edition as it was part of the 2020–2021 speed skating season.

Schedule

Medalists

Men

Women

Source: https://www.schaatsen.nl/kalender/2020/10/daikin-nk-afstanden/

References

External links
 KNSB

Dutch Single Distance Championships
Single Distance Championships
2021 Single Distance
KNSB Dutch Single Distance Championships, 2021